Marte Eliasson (born September 27, 1969 in Trondheim) is a Norwegian team handball player and Olympic medalist. She received a silver medal at the 1988 Summer Olympics in Seoul with the Norwegian national team. Marte Eliasson played 145 games for the national team during her career, scoring 179 goals.

References

External links

1969 births
Living people
Norwegian female handball players
Olympic silver medalists for Norway
Olympic handball players of Norway
Handball players at the 1988 Summer Olympics
Sportspeople from Trondheim
Olympic medalists in handball
Medalists at the 1988 Summer Olympics
20th-century Norwegian women